Ambrose Thomas may refer to:

 Ambrose Thomas (artist) (1880–1959), English artist
 Ambroise Thomas (1811–1896), French composer